Jair Torrico (born 2 August 1986) is a Bolivian footballer who played for clubs including The Strongest.

Honours 
The Strongest
Winner
 Liga de Fútbol Profesional Boliviano (3): 2011–12, 2012–13, 2013–14

Runners-up
 Liga de Fútbol Profesional Boliviano (2): 2011–12, 2014–15

Wilstermann
Winner
 Liga de Fútbol Profesional Boliviano: 2010

References

External links 
 

1986 births
Living people
Sportspeople from Cochabamba
Bolivian footballers
Bolivia international footballers
C.D. Jorge Wilstermann players
The Strongest players
Sport Boys Warnes players
Club San José players
Club Always Ready players
Association football defenders